The non-marine molluscs of Cyprus are a part of the molluscan fauna of Cyprus (wildlife of Cyprus).

A number of species of non-marine molluscs are found in the wild in Cyprus.

Freshwater gastropods 
Freshwater gastropods in Cyprus include:

Neritidae
 Theodoxus anatolicus (Recluz 1841)

Melanopsidae
 Melanopsis praemorsa (Linnaeus 1758)

Hydrobiidae
 Islamia mylonas Radea, Parmakelis, Demetropoulos & Vardinoyannis, 2017
 Pseudamnicola malickyi Schütt 1980

Tateidae
 Potamopyrgus antipodarum (Gray 1843)

Lymnaeidae
 Galba truncatula (O. F. Müller 1774)
 Radix peregra (O. F. Müller 1774)

Physidae
 Physella acuta (Draparnaud 1801)

Planorbidae
 Ancylus fluviatilis O. F. Müller 1774
 Gyraulus piscinarum (Bourguignat 1852)

Land gastropods 
Land gastropods in Cyprus include:
Ellobiidae
 Carychium sp. 

Succineidae
 Succinea putris (Linnaeus, 1758)

Cochlicopidae
 Cochlicopa lubrica (O. F. Müller, 1774)

Lauridae
 Lauria cylindracea (Da Costa, 1778)

Orculidae
 Orculella sirianocoriensis (Mousson, 1854)

Pleurodiscidae
 Pleurodiscus cyprius (Kobelt, 1896)

Pyramidulidae
 Pyramidula pusilla (Vallot, 1801)
 Pyramidula rupestris (Draparnaud, 1801)

Truncatellinidae
 Truncatellina cylindrica (J. B. Férussac, 1807) (as Truncatellina rothi (Reinhardt, 1916))

Valloniidae
 Gittenbergia sororcula (Benoit, 1859)
 Vallonia pulchella (O. F. Müller, 1774)

Chondrinidae
 Granopupa granum (Draparnaud, 1801)
 Rupestrella rhodia (J. R. Roth, 1839)

Enidae
 Buliminus carneus (Pfeiffer, 1846)
 Euchondrus ledereri (Pfeiffer, 1868)
 Euchondrus limbodentatus (Mousson, 1854)
 Euchondrus nucifragus (Pfeiffer, 1848)
 Euchondrus parreyssi (Pfeiffer, 1846)
 Multidentula lamellifera (Rossmässler, 1858)
 Multidentula stylus (Pfeiffer, 1848)
 Paramastus cyprius Zilch, 1951
 Turanena katerinae E. Gittenberger, 1996
 Zebrina fasciolata (Olivier, 1801)

Clausiliidae
 Albinaria alajana cypria Nordsieck, 1993
 Albinaria greeni Tomlin, 1935
 Albinaria greeni amorosa H. Nordsieck, 2021
 Albinaria greeni greeni Tomlin, 1935
 Albinaria mavromoustakisi Brandt, 1961
 Albinaria rollei (Boettger, 1896)
 Albinaria saxatilis (Pfeiffer, 1846)
 Albinaria saxatilis avia (Charpentier, 1852)
 Albinaria saxatilis saxatilis (Pfeiffer, 1846)
 Albinaria virgo (Mousson, 1854)
 Elia moesta (Rossmässler, 1839)

Punctidae
 Paralaoma servilis (Shuttleworth, 1852)
 Punctum pygmaeum (Draparnaud, 1801)

Oxychilidae
 Carpathica cretica (Forcart, 1950)
 Daudebardia rufa (Draparnaud, 1805)
 Eopolita protensa (A. Férussac, 1832)
 Mediterranea hydatina (Rossmässler, 1838)
 Oxychilus camelinus (Bourguignat, 1852)
 Oxychilus cyprius (L. Pfeiffer, 1847)
 Oxychilus mavromoustakisi (F. Haas, 1934)

Pristilomatidae
 Gollumia torumbilicata Schütt, 2001
 Vitrea contracta (Westerlund, 1871)
 Vitrea cyprina Westerlund, 1902

Agriolimacidae
 Deroceras berytensis (Bourguignat, 1852)
 Deroceras chrysorroyatissensis Rähle, 1984
 Deroceras famagustensis Rähle, 1991

Limacidae
 Limacus flavus (Linnaeus, 1758)

Milacidae
 Milax barypus Bourguignat, 1866
 Milax riedeli Wiktor, 1986
 Tandonia sowerbyi (A. Férussac, 1823)

Achatinidae
 Rumina saharica Pallary, 1901

Ferrusaciidae
 Calaxis hierosolymarum (J. R. Roth, 1855) (occasionally as Calaxis cypria (Kobelt, 1896))
 Cecilioides acicula (O. F. Müller, 1774)
 Cecilioides tumulorum (Bourguignat, 1856)
 Hohenwartiana hohenwarti (Rossmässler, 1839)

Geomitridae
 Candidula syrensis (Pfeiffer, 1846)
 Cochlicella acuta (Muller, 1774)
 Cochlicella conoidea (Draparnaud, 1801)
 Helicella juglans Gittenberger, 1991
 Helicopsis filimargo (Krynicki, 1833)
 Helicopsis cypriola (Westerlund, 1889)
 Microxeromagna armillata (Lowe, 1852)
 Pseudoxerophila confusa Gittenberger, 1991
 Trochoidea liebetruti (Albers, 1852)
 Trochoidea pyramidata (Draparnaud, 1805)
 Xerocrassa carinatoglobosa (Haas, 1934)
 Xerocrassa cretica (L. Pfeiffer, 1841)
 Xerocrassa nicosiana (Gittenberger, 1991)
 Xeromunda candiota (Mousson, 1854)
 Xeropicta akrotirica Gittenberger, 1991
 Xeropicta krynickii (Krynicki, 1833) (including Ceropicta smyrnocretica and Xeropicta vestalis)
 Xeropicta ledereri (Pfeiffer, 1856)
 Xeropicta ledereri ledereri (Pfeiffer, 1856)
 Xeropicta ledereri mavromoustakisi (Haas, 1933)
 Xeropicta mesopotamica  (Mousson, 1874)
 Xerotricha apicina (Lamarck, 1822)
 Xerotricha conspurcata (Draparnaud, 1801)

Hygromiidae
 Metafruticicola berytensis (L. Pfeiffer, 1841)
 Metafruticicola nicosianus (Mousson, 1854)
 Monacha syriaca (Ehrenberg, 1831)

Helicidae
 Cantareus apertus (Born, 1778)
 Cornu aspersum (O. F. Müller, 1774)
 Eobania vermiculata (O. F. Müller, 1774)
 Assyriella bellardii (Mousson, 1854)
 Helix cincta O. F. Müller, 1758
 Helix nucula Mousson, 1854 (occasionally as Helix texta)
 Levantina spiriplana (Olivier, 1801)
 Theba pisana (O. F. Müller, 1774)

Polygyridae
 Polygyra cereolus (Megerle von Mühlfeldt, 1818)

Trissexodontidae
 Caracollina lenticula (Michaud, 1831)

Freshwater bivalves
Freshwater bivalves in Cyprus include:

Sphaeriidae
 Pisidium casertanum (Poli 1795)

See also
Lists of molluscs of surrounding oversea countries:
 List of non-marine molluscs of Turkey
 List of non-marine molluscs of Syria
 List of non-marine molluscs of Lebanon
 List of non-marine molluscs of Israel
 List of non-marine molluscs of Egypt

References

Molluscs, Non
Molluscs
Cyprus
Cyprus
Cyprus